Iran, officially the Islamic Republic of Iran is participating in World Games since 1993.

Medal table

Medals by games

Medals by sport

List of medalists

Official sports

Invitational sports

References

Nations at the World Games
World Games